The Chale Sonbak Desert is located in south-west of Maranjab Desert, Iran and around north of Abuzeydabad.

References

External links
Deserts of Iran

Deserts of Iran
Geography of Isfahan Province